The Juniorvlet is a steel sailing and rowing boat. It is used by the Sea Scouts of Scouting Nederland in the Netherlands. It is a smaller version of the Lelievlet craft, special designed for ages 8 to 13 years. Like a Lelievlet it can be used for Sculling, rowing and sailing. There are around 40 juniorvlets in use.

Details and specifications
 Length: 4.00 m
 Width: 1.62 m 
 Height: 4.00 m 
 Avg. Weight: 350 kg 
 Sail: 7.00 m2

External links
 Juniorvletten, Lelievletten en Lelieschouwen Scouting Nederland (Dutch)

Dinghies
Scouting and Guiding in the Netherlands